Godley may refer to:

People
 Adam Godley (born 1964), British actor
 Alfred Denis Godley, known as A. D. Godley (1856–1925), English classical scholar and author of light verse
 Alexander Godley (1867–1957), British Army General with the New Zealand and Australian Division at Gallipoli; cousin of the 1st Baron Kilbracken
 Arthur Godley, 1st Baron Kilbracken (1847–1932), British Permanent Under-Secretary of State for India; cousin of Alexander Godley
 Bill Godley (1879–unknown), English footballer 
 Charlotte Godley (1821–1907) was a New Zealand letter-writer and community leader; mother of Arthur Godley
 Eric Godley (1919–2010), New Zealand botanist and biographer
 G. McMurtrie Godley (1917–1999), U.S. Ambassador to Laos and Assistant Secretary of State for East Asian and Pacific Affairs
 George Godley, British police officer involved in the hunt for Jack the Ripper in 1888
 Hugh Godley, 2nd Baron Kilbracken (1877–1950), Irish nobleman
 Janey Godley (born 1961), Scottish comedian, newspaper columnist, and author
 John Godley, 3rd Baron Kilbracken (1920–2006), British-born Irish peer
 John Robert Godley (1814–1861), British bureaucrat and statesman; an original resident in Canterbury, New Zealand
 Kevin Godley (born 1945), British musician and music video director and part of the Godley & Creme musical partnership
 Leonidas M. Godley (1836–1904), American Civil War Union Army soldier; recipient of the Medal of Honor
 Robert Godley (born 1971), British designer of men's clothing
 Sean Godley (born 1981), Irish-Australian poet and writer, brother of the 4th Baron Kilbracken
 Sidney Godley (1889–1957), British Army World War I soldier and German prisoner of war; recipient of the Victoria Cross
 Wynne Godley (1926–2010), British economist
 Zack Godley (born 1990), American professional baseball pitcher

Places
New Zealand
 Godley Head, northern headland to Lyttelton Harbour

United Kingdom
 Godley, Greater Manchester
 Godley East railway station
 Godley railway station
 Godley Reservoir
 Godley Hundred in Surrey

United States
 Godley, Illinois
 Godley Independent School District
 Godley, Texas

Other
 Godley & Creme, English rock duo composed of Kevin Godley and Lol Creme
 Changing Faces – The Very Best of 10cc and Godley & Creme, released in 1987
 Cry (Godley & Creme song), released in 1985
 Consequences (Godley & Creme album), released in 1977
 Freeze Frame (Godley & Creme album), released in 1979
 Godley River, alpine braided river flowing through Canterbury in New Zealand
 Godley Statue, Christchurch memorial for John Robert Godley